Luke Stoltman Luke Bernard Stoltman (born 22 November 1984) is a Scottish professional strongman competitor, 5 time winner of Scotland’s Strongest Man and 2021 Europe’s Strongest Man champion. Renowned for his static shoulder strength, Luke currently holds the British Log Press record. Along with younger brother, Tom Stoltman, the two are widely regarded as the strongest brothers in history and are the only ones to both qualify for the World’s Strongest Man finals; a feat they have managed in 2019, 2021 and 2022.

Early life 
Born in Invergordon, Ross and Cromarty, Luke was the first of five children for parents Bernhard and Sheila. Luke attended Newmore Primary School and Invergordon Academy and was an avid footballer in his early years before moving his focus to weight training by the age of 15 inspired by a family photo of his grandfather, a Polish war refugee, carrying a log the same size as his body.  Luke left school aged 16 and followed his father’s footsteps into the oil industry training as a dimensional surveyor before taking his first offshore based job aged 18. Throughout his early twenties, Luke’s training consisted of predominantly bodybuilder type programmes, influenced by the likes of Jay Cutler and Ronnie Coleman; although he was often limited by the gym equipment available on the oil rigs he worked on.

Career 
Luke later became more interested in the strength aspect of his training, entering, and winning his first contest, a local deadlift competition in 2011 aged 27. This led to him participating in the ‘Highlands Strongest Man’ in 2012, held in a gym car park in Inverness, where he again placed first.

A relative late comer to the sport, Luke’s impressive feats at the local competitions convinced him to pursue strongman training seriously, albeit alongside his ‘9-5 job’ working on oil rigs. In 2013 Luke competed in his first UK's Strongest Man, where he placed 7th. He then went on to secure 5 consecutive Scotland’s Strongest Man titles from 2013 – 2017, and consistently improved his Britain's Strongest Man (BSM) placing each year, reaching 4th by 2017.

A debut at World’s Strongest Man came in 2016, after a solid performance at Europe’s Strongest Man the previous year. Although Luke failed to reach the final, after a 3rd place finish in his heat, he gained invaluable experience and was starting to get noticed on the international stage.  The following year (2017) he again improved on his BSM placing (4th) and at WSM he narrowly missed a place in the final, finishing 3rd in his heat behind future WSM champions Hafthor Bjornsson and Martins Licis.

At this stage in Luke’s career, although he was steadily improving his strength, it was not reflected in his contest results. In 2018 he again missed out on a World’s Strongest Man Final qualification, losing out to four time WSM winner Zydrunas Savickas and Robert Oberst in the heats, and placing a disappointing 6th at BSM. Luke’s job, where he would work offshore for two to three weeks at a time on oil rigs without access to the suitable strongman training equipment, was seen to be hampering his preparation for competition.

In 2019 Luke took the leap into full-time training, leaving his job in the oil and gas industry to focus solely on fulfilling his potential as a world level strongman competitor. A decision helped by placing second the 2019 World's Ultimate Strongman International. This led to a significant breakthrough as he successfully qualified for the WSM final in his first year as a professional, finishing 7thoverall alongside younger brother Tom, who placed 5th. The pair were the first brothers to ever reach the final at WSM, and an achievement that gained them the moniker ‘The World’s Strongest Brothers’.

2020 brought Luke’s first podium finish at BSM. However with training and competition hampered by the COVID-19 outbreak, Luke was unable to enter Europe’s Strongest Man, and failed to qualify from his heat at the WSM finals. That same year however, Luke established a British record in the log press, successfully completing a 221 kg/487 lb lift at World Ultimate Strongman’s “Feats of Strength” showcase. Disappointment at World’s was short-lived, as 2021 proved to be Luke’s best year to date. At the age of 36, Luke took the title of Europe’s Strongest Man and followed this amazing feat up by taking first place at the Giants Live World Tour Finals. In WSM he was close to a podium position, however the extreme heat and the wrong tacky selection in the final event led to him slipping from 3rd to 7th, repeating his 2019 result, whilst brother Tom lifted the winner’s trophy.

In 2022 Luke gained a podium finish at the Arnold Classic in Ohio in March, taking 3rd place behind Martin Licis and Oleksii Novikov. Luke narrowly missed out on retaining his Europe’s Strongest Man crown, finishing a credible second to Ukrainian WSM 2020 winner, Oleksii Novikov.  At Worlds Strongest Man 2022, held in Sacramento, California, Luke won his heat by a considerable margin allowing him to qualify for the final with an event to spare. In the final itself, Luke repeated his Finals success of the previous two appearances, finishing 7th in a line up that contained four previous winners. The competition was won by Tom for the second year in a row.

2022 favouritism controversy 
A day prior to the 2022 World's Strongest Man competition, then director for World's Ultimate Strongman, Mark Boyd, leaked a telephone conversation with Luke Stoltman, in which Luke stated "... and here's the sneaky bit, so Colin's (Colin Bryce, director of Giants Live who assists in the running of the World's Strongest Man) gonna, not promised, but he says we will get more favorable groups, events, etc. in Worlds if we kinda play ball and then he can help push the Stoltman brand; if that makes sense in the Giants Live, so basically what he did for Eddie (Eddie Hall)..." The audio was released shortly after the groups for the competition were announced, with some fans speculating on the level of difficulty of the Stoltmans' groups compared to others. Boyd has since deleted this video from his Instagram account. Prior to deletion however, he claims to have given several months for athletes to expose the corruption on their own, indicating that he also had contacted IGM directors to no avail. 

Luke released his own response video on YouTube later that day, in which he states that the clip was taken out of context, with the conversation being 90 minutes long, and explains that he simply told Boyd what he wanted to hear because he did not want to take part in Boyd's upcoming competition. 

However up-to-date IMG, the World's Strongest Man or Colin Bryce has not yet responded to the accusations.

Family & Personal Life 
Luke is the eldest of five siblings, all of which live in and around their hometown of Invergordon close to their father, Ben. Luke’s youngest brother Harry works for the Stoltman Brothers business and is currently training to compete in strongman competition. Luke married wife Kushi Stoltman in 2016 at a ceremony in Kincraig Castle Hotel, by Invergordon.

Luke’s mother Shiela passed away aged 56 in 2016. Both Luke and Tom regularly cite their mother’s influence as key to inspiring them to succeed in their careers.

In 2021 a permanent tribute to Luke and brother Tom was installed by Invergordon Community Council in their hometown, where the signs at the entrances to Invergordon were updated to include their names and achievements.  The sign reads ‘Welcome to Invergordon Hometown of the Stoltman Brothers World, European and UK Strongest Men’.

Luke is a strong advocate for mental health and regularly speaks out on the topic and about how he benefitted from speaking to a therapist after the death of his mother. Luke has worked as an ambassador for mental health charity Mikeysline.

Other Ventures

Gym 
In 2018, Luke and Tom opened a commercial gym, The Stoltman Strength Centre, in Invergordon. This was originally a joint venture with another party though is now fully owned by the Stoltman Brothers Ltd. Luke was quoted as saying he had always wanted to open his own gym to inspire others. The brothers use the facility for the majority of their training, having originally trained in Luke’s home gym in his garage.

Health and Fitness Brand 
As the popularity of the brothers has risen through their achievements and media presence, they began to sell Stoltman Brothers branded merchandise via an online shop www.stoltmanbrothers.com. Original offerings were primarily focused around images of the brothers; however this has now been built up to include more everyday ‘lifestyle’ clothing with Stoltman branding, ‘motivational’ apparel featuring some of the company/brothers’ values and quotes, and more recently a collaboration with other strongmen where t-shirts with the athletes images are produced. All clothing is sold via the Stoltman brothers website, with preparations also currently underway to open a shop in Invergordon.

Media 
Together with brother Tom, Luke has a YouTube channel, Stoltman Brothers, through which they show training and competition footage, partake in various challenges, and provide an insight to everyday life for professional strongmen athletes. The brothers regularly collaborate on the channel with other well known health and fitness personalities and YouTubers, with Eddie Hall, Matt Does Fitness, Hafþór Júlíus Björnsson and Larry Wheels all having featured.

The brothers are also the subject of a documentary which is currently in production. Footage for which has been shot by Mulligan Brothers Studio and documents the brothers rise to prominence as elite level strongmen athletes and inspirational figures.

Publications and other media 
Luke and Tom both feature and narrate in Coach Mike Chadwick's The Red On Revolution book, published in 2022.

Personal record 
In competition:
Deadlift (with straps and suit) – 
 Hummer Tire Deadlift – 
Squat (T-bar setup) –  (2022 Arnold Strongman Classic)
 Log Lift –  (British record)
 Axle Press – 
Flint stone press - 
Gym lifts:
Squat – 
Bench press – 
Log Lift –

References

External links 
 Stoltman Brothers website www.stoltmanbrothers.com
 Luke Stoltman on instagram
 Luke Stoltman on twitter

Living people
Scottish strength athletes
British strength athletes
Scottish sportsmen
People from Ross and Cromarty
1984 births